Manggar Baru is a subdistrict in the East Balikpapan, Balikpapan. On August 16, 2013, Manggar Baru became one of the representatives of East Kalimantan who participated in the "Best Subdistrict at the National", then passed the verification stage from the national assessment team and made it into the top six subsidtrict national held in Jakarta.

Tourisms
 Manggar Segarasari Beach (Pantai Manggar Segarasari)

References

External links
 Manggar Baru subdistrict blogsite (in Indonesia)

Balikpapan